Băiceni may refer to several places in Romania:

 Băiceni, a village in Curtești Commune, Botoșani County
 Băiceni, a village in Cucuteni Commune, Iași County
 Băiceni, a village in Todirești Commune, Iași County
 Băiceni (river), a tributary of the Dresleuca in Botoșani County